Lot 57 is a township in Queens County, Prince Edward Island, Canada.  It is part of St. John's Parish. Lot 57 was awarded to merchant Samuel Smith and Captain James Smith in the 1767 land lottery. By 1803, it had been sold to the Thomas Douglas, 5th Earl of Selkirk.

Villages
Belfast, Prince Edward Island

Unincorporated communities
Bellevue 
Eldon 	
Grandview 	
Iona 	
Kinross 		
Lower Newtown 
Lyndale 	
Mount Buchanan 	
Newtown Cross 	
Orwell 
Orwell Cove 	
Point Prim 	
Township 57

References

57
Geography of Queens County, Prince Edward Island